Baton Rouge is the capital city of the U.S. state of Louisiana.

Baton Rouge may also refer to:

Places
 Baton Rouge, South Carolina, an unincorporated community

Businesses
 Baton Rouge (restaurant), a Canadian restaurant chain

Ships
 USC&GS Baton Rouge (1875), previously USCS Baton Rouge, a survey ship in commission in the United States Coast Survey from 1875 to 1878 and in the United States Coast and Geodetic Survey from 1878 to 1880
 USS Baton Rouge (SSN-689), a United States Navy submarine in commission from 1977 to 1995

Arts
 Baton Rouge (band), American hard rock band
 Bâton rouge (film), 1985 French film

Other
 Petit bâton rouge, a small red stick used for color grading by the Tabasco pepper harvesters 

ru:Батон-Руж